Sar Kahnan or Sarkahnan may refer to:
 Sar Kahnan, Bikah, Hormozgan Province
 Sar Kahnan, Rudkhaneh, Hormozgan Province
 Sarkahnan-e Davari, Hormozgan Province
 Sarkahnan, Kerman